The Sharp Mesa Vista is a psychiatric hospital run by Sharp HealthCare.  It opened in 1998. The facility has 149 licensed beds.

Features
Sharp Mesa Vista Hospital is the largest privately operated psychiatric hospital in San Diego, as well as a premier provider of mental health, chemical dependency and substance abuse in the greater San Diego area. The hospital provides comprehensive behavioral health services for children, adolescents, adults and seniors experiencing anxiety, bipolar disorder, depression, eating disorders and other conditions.

Services
 Chemical Dependency
 Child and Adolescent
 Cognitive Treatment
 Dual Recovery Program
 Electroconvulsive Therapy
 Older Adult Services
 Treatment for Opiate Dependence

Awards
In November 2007, Sharp HealthCare was awarded the Malcolm Baldrige National Quality Award by the United States National Institute of Standards and Technology. Sharp was one of five organizations to receive the award, which is the nation's highest Presidential honor for quality and organizational performance excellence. Sharp was the first health care provider in California and the eighth in the nation to receive this recognition.

References

External links
 Official site of Sharp HealthCare
 Official site of Sharp Mesa Vista Hospital
 Sharp documentary

Hospitals in San Diego
Companies based in San Diego
Psychiatric hospitals in California
Hospitals established in 1998